Mediterranean Opera and Ballet Club (AKOB) is a non-profit cultural organization based in Mersin, Turkey.

History
Mersin Culture Center Association, another association known for valuable contributions in the past to musical life of Mersin, is presently engaged to Mersin International Music Festival. Thus AKOB was founded in 2008 to take over and revive its old spirit and mission under the guidance and direction of the renowned composer and maestro Selman Ada, who was then living in Mersin,

Activities
In 2009, together with the artists of Mersin State Opera and Ballet, AKOB organized a tribute concert for the passionate lover of Mersin (who was born in Limonlu, a town in Mersin Province), composer Prof. Nevit Kodallı. Another concert was organized for Hanri Atat, a patron of art and music in Mersin.

In 2010, after cooperating with Istanbul Austrian Culture Office and Istanbul Goethe Institute, AOBK organized four concerts by international artists. The same year, AOBK began publishing a culture and art magazine, which includes English as well as Turkish articles to address to foreign readers.

See also
İçel Sanat Kulübü (Art club of Mrsin)

References

Turkey
Culture in Mersin
Turkish music
Arts organizations established in 2008
2008 establishments in Turkey